The 2011 Sports Racer Series is the second running of the Sports Racer Series, an Australian motor racing series for small engined sports racing cars. The series began in 2010 but died after the second round at Wakefeild Park due to lack of numbers. The 2011 season has a more compact four round series over three states.

The number of entries has been impacted as all of the 2010 series Radical-equipped drivers have left for their own series single-marque series, the Radical Australia Cup. As a result, only 14 drivers have appeared so far representing cars built by Minetti Sports Cars, Speads Racing Cars and Stohr Cars, as well as West Race Cars.

At the halfway mark of the series, Stohr driver Adam Proctor dominates the series having won all six races outright, as well as winning the small capacity Class One with a perfect 228 points. Proctor is the only non-West driver in Class One and he holds a 14-point lead over the leading West driver in the class, Mark Laucke. Jonathon Stoeckel sits in third place, 13 points further behind.

In Class Two, West WX10 driver Aaron Steer leads the points having won the Class Two division in the four races in which the larger Class Two cars have had finishers. Races two and three at Winton saw none of the four cars present finish either race. Steer leads Minetti driver Scott Bingham by 47 points. Steer and Bingham are the only drivers with more than one race finish for the season.

Calendar
The 2011 Sports Racer Series will consist of four events.

Teams and drivers
The following teams and drivers have competed during the 2011 Sports Racer Series.

Drivers' points 
Points were are 38–35–33–32–31–30 etc. based on race positions in each race, in each class. Points based on official series website.

References

External links
Sports racer Web Page

Sports Racer
Australian Prototype Series